USS Susanne (SP-411) was a United States Navy patrol vessel in commission from 1917 to 1919.
 
Susanne was built as a private motorboat of the same name in 1916 by the Matthews Boat Company at Port Clinton, Ohio. In May 1917, the U.S. Navy acquired her from her owner, T. J. Prindiville of Chicago, Illinois, for use as a section patrol boat during World War I. She was commissioned as USS Susanne (SP-411) on 3 August 1917.

Assigned to the 9th Naval District, Susanne served on patrol duties on the Great Lakes for the remainder of World War I. She was renamed USS SP-411 in 1918.

SP-411 was stricken from the Navy List and sold on 15 November 1919.

Susanne (SP-411) should not be confused with the motorboat Susanne, also constructed by the Matthews Boat Company and inspected for World War I Navy service as  but never commissioned, or with the patrol vessel , which was in commission at the same time.

References

NavSource Online: Section Patrol Craft Photo Archive: Susanne (SP 411)

Patrol vessels of the United States Navy
World War I patrol vessels of the United States
Ships built in Port Clinton, Ohio
1916 ships